Rodež (formerly Sveti Lenart) is a village in the Municipality of Zagorje ob Savi in central Slovenia. The area is part of the traditional region of Lower Carniola. It is now included with the rest of the municipality in the Central Sava Statistical Region. The village includes the hamlets of Klenovik and Boriče.

Name
The name Rodež is derived from the common noun *rodina 'uncultivated land, fallow land', referring to the local geography. It is etymologically related to toponyms such as Rodik, Rodine, and Rodni Vrh.

Church
The local church is dedicated to Saint Leonard and belongs to the Parish of Šentjurij–Podkum. It has a Romanesque nave dating to the 13th century onto which a new sanctuary was built after 1350. The belfry dates to the 16th century.

References

External links
Rodež on Geopedia

Populated places in the Municipality of Zagorje ob Savi